A.S. Dragon is a French rock group, consisting of the members Stéphane Salvi (guitar), Michaël Garçon (piano), David Forgione remplace Fred Jimenez (bass) and Hervé Bouétard (drums). Natacha Le Jeune (singer) quit the group in 2007.

The emancipation of a backing band
Formed by the label Tricatel, A.S. Dragon was originally created by their founder Bertrand Burgalat as a group to accompany the writer/poet/singer Michel Houellebecq. They founded the group out of many former members of Montecarl, and the singer, Uminski, was a childhood friend of Romain Humeau, the singer of Eiffel, who had formerly been the "backing band" of Houellebecq.

After having been assured of the deal with Houellebecq, A.S. Dragon recorded with Burgalat, and released a live album : Bertrand Burgalat Meets A.S. Dragon. The musicians collaborated with many other singers who influenced them, such as Alain Chamfort and Jacno.

But the group became frustrated at not having a real existence, and therefore decided to recruit the singer Natacha Le Jeune. Free from its mentors, A. S. Dragon recorded two albums, still with Tricatel : Spanked in 2003, and Va chercher la police in 2005.

Between sixties pop, garage-punk and variety
The founder members of A.S. Dragon were mostly influenced by pop from the 60s/70s, which can be found in their sugary compositions, classical arrangements, and psychedelia, typical of the genre. But the arrival of Natacha in the group expanded their musical horizons to sound more like a female Iggy Pop and included references to the Stooges, in their music (more aggressive sounding), in the lyrics, (the song "I wanna be your doll" recalls the famous "I Wanna Be Your Dog"), and overall in their noisy concerts, which literally showed their rock energy.

In May 2007, A.S. Dragon announced an album without the participation of Natacha; they chose to recruit their next singer for their opus from their blog on Myspace. The disc was produced by A.S. Dragon, formed from their concerts.

Former member of A.S. Dragon, Peter Von Poehl, who has since launched a solo career.

Discography
Bertrand Burgalat Meets A.S Dragon (2001)
 Follow Me
 Alsthom
 Ma Rencontre
 Kim
 Gris Métal
 O.K. Scorpions
 Aux Cyclades Électronique
 Sugar
 Jalousies Et Tomettes
 A.S Dragon
 The Tears Of A Clown

Spanked (2003)
 Dog Love Dog
 Dirty
 Mais Pas Chez Moi
 Your Fame
 Sorcière
 Are We Talking Enough?
 Drowning
 Spank On Me
 Une Hémisphère Dans Une Chevelure
 Dedicated To The Press
 Nighttime
 One Two Three Four Boys

Va chercher la police (2006)
 Morte
 Cher Tueur
 Comme Je Suis
 L'Alchimiste
 Seules A Paris
 Corine
 I Wanna Be Your Doll
 Plastic Hooker
 Froide
 Naufrages De L'Ombre
 Cloue-Moi Au Ciel
 Tell Me

Balles Depe (2012)

External links
The official site

French rock music groups